Springlands is a rural locality in the Whitsunday Region, Queensland, Australia.

Geography 
The locality completely surrounds the localities of Collinsville and Scottville.

Springlands has the following mountains:

 Mount Bella Vista 
 Mount Devlin 
 Mount Jimmy 
 Mount Toussaint 
 Mount Vista 
 Pine Mountain 
 Sonoma Peak 

The majority of the southern boundary is aligned with the Bowen River. Sonoma State Forest covers 8,800 hectares in the north-east of Springlands.

History 

Heritage listings 

Springlands has a number of heritage-listed sites, including:
 Strathmore Homestead, Strathmore Road

Economy 
The Collinsville coal mine is located in the locality extending into neighbouring Collinsville.  

There are four solar farms operated by Edify in Springlands:

 Daydream Solar Farm
 Hayman Solar Farm
 Whitsunday Solar Farm
 Hamilton Solar Farm

Education 
There are no schools in Springlands. The nearest government primary schools are in Collinsville State School in neighbouring Collinsville and Scotville State School in neighbouring Scotville. The nearest government secondary school is Collinsville State High School in Collinsville.

References 

Whitsunday Region
Localities in Queensland